Nicholas Holland "Cole" Grossman (born April 10, 1989 in St. Louis, Missouri) is a former American soccer player who most recently played for Stabæk in the Norwegian Eliteserien.

Career

College and amateur
Grossman is a product of Duke University, where he appeared in 70 career games (starting 59) and achieved 25 goals and 24 assists. During his time with Duke, Grossman was a two-time NSCAA All-South Region team pick (2nd in 2009 and 1st in 2010) and was named in the All-ACC teams twice (2nd 2009 and 1st in 2010). He was named a Soccer America and TopDrawerSoccer.com All-American in 2010.

During his college years, Grossman also played with the Cary Clarets of the USL Premier Development League during their 2009 season.

Professional
On January 14, 2011, Grossman was drafted in the second round (28th overall) in the 2011 MLS SuperDraft by Columbus Crew. He made his professional debut on February 22, 2011 in the first leg of the Crew's CONCACAF Champions League quarter-final series against Real Salt Lake.

On November 19, 2012 Grossman was selected by Real Salt Lake in the waiver draft, after being released by Columbus earlier that day.

After two seasons with Salt Lake, in January 2015 Grossman signed with Stabæk in Norway's top league, the Tippeligaen. Grossman made his debut with Stabæk on 6 April 2015. He left the club on 1 January 2017.

Career statistics

Club

References

External links
 
 Duke profile

1989 births
Living people
American soccer players
American expatriate soccer players
Duke Blue Devils men's soccer players
Cary Clarets players
Columbus Crew players
Real Salt Lake players
Stabæk Fotball players
Expatriate footballers in Norway
Columbus Crew draft picks
USL League Two players
Major League Soccer players
Eliteserien players
American expatriate sportspeople in Norway
Association football midfielders